Hamilton Harris (May 1, 1820 – December 14, 1900) was an American lawyer and politician from New York.

Life
Hamilton Harris was born in Preble, New York on May 1, 1820. He graduated from Union College in 1841. Then he studied law, was admitted to the bar in 1845, and practiced in Albany. He married Lucy Moody Rogers (1829–1898).

He was a member of the New York State Assembly (Albany Co., 3rd D.) in 1851; and District Attorney of Albany County from 1854 to 1856.

He was a member of the New York State Republican Committee from 1864 to 1870; and a member of the Board of Capitol Commissioners from 1865 to 1875.

He was a member of the New York State Senate (13th D.) from 1876 to 1879, sitting in the 99th, 100th, 101st and 102nd New York State Legislatures.

In 1885, he was elected a Regent of the University of the State of New York.

He died in Albany on December 14, 1900, and was buried at the Albany Rural Cemetery in Menands, New York.

References

External links

1820 births
1900 deaths
New York (state) state senators
Politicians from Albany, New York
Members of the New York State Assembly
New York (state) Whigs
19th-century American politicians
Regents of the University of the State of New York
New York (state) Republicans
Union College (New York) alumni
People from Cortland County, New York
Albany County District Attorneys
Burials at Albany Rural Cemetery
Lawyers from Albany, New York
19th-century American lawyers